Angels & Thieves is the second studio album by Canadian band Dala. It was released on November 1, 2005.

Track listing

Personnel
 Sheila Carabine - lead and background vocals, acoustic guitar, piano, keyboards
 Amanda Walther - lead and background vocals, guitar, piano, keyboards, harmonica, ukulele, strum stick
 Mike Roth - guitar, bass, keyboards, percussion, producer, engineer
 Adrian Vanelli - drums, percussion
 Mike Carabine - guitar
 Dan Roth - guitar
 Andrew Rozalowsky - bass
 Tim Walther - tambourine
 Tawgs Salter - bass, drums, percussion, guitar, keyboards

References

External links

2005 albums
Dala (band) albums